The experience of women in early New England differed greatly and depended on one's social group acquired at birth. Puritans, Native Americans, and people coming from the Caribbean and across the Atlantic, were the three largest groups in the region, the latter of these being smaller in proportion to the first two. Puritan communities were characteristically strict, religious, and in constant development. The separate colonies that formed around Massachusetts and Rhode Island began as centralized towns that expanded quickly during the seventeenth century.

In native society, before the introduction of Europeans, the roles occupied by women and men were divided along lines of class and gender, and were generally more egalitarian than in Puritan society. Native women after the introduction of European social, legal, and religious beliefs adapted to and in some my within their indigenous tribe. The often overlooked and sparsely recorded account of women who arrived as slaves and free people from the Caribbean is difficult to pinpoint because almost every written record of their lives is from the perspective of white, male elites and slave owners, who treated the women and men they owned as property.

Colonial women in 17th-century New England 
New England colonists living in Puritan-established settlements in the seventeenth century dealt with many of the same realities. During the seventeenth century in New England, colonial settlements saw a rapid expansion from roughly 1620 onward. The common assumption that Puritan society was homogeneous holds some truth, but this was not the case in matters of wealth. As communities became more established, people naturally accumulated more material possessions, and those differed in quality from family to family. This makes sense, as little physical money circulated in the early colonies, making tangible objects both proof of wealth and status. One example of this early disparity comes from a recorded inventory from 1652 of one William Pontus whose land, house, and furnishings were valued at thirteen pounds. Yet in 1654, the estate of “Miss Ann Attwood” recorded the ownership of eighteen table clothes and sixty-six cloth napkins, her other assets not included. Other than suggesting that fabrics, too, played a part in one's show of wealth, this comparison is rather extreme, but clearly illustrates a major force that impacted daily life in places like Plymouth Colony. However, the actual function of social norms outweighed wealth when it came to personal roles and interactions.

Social structure 
Puritan society was overwhelmingly male dominated, which was reflected in just about every area of public life. Women could not own property independently, and therefore could not vote, a privilege that was awarded to “freemen”, or men when owned property. Women were excluded from enacting laws, serving in courts, creating taxes, and supervising land distribution, all of which were government functions. The role of religion was also divided by gender, since nearly every colonist in New England was Christian in some form. Yet in this area, women were also seen as lesser to God than men were. Men were inferior to God and women were inferior to men, so went the logic of social hierarchy. The average lifespan of a seventeenth century female colonist in New England who made it to her twenty-first year was about 63. This age was about seven years less than the male average, and is often considered by historians to be a result of childbirth, although this claim is not widely agreed upon.

Private life, if it can truly be considered private in the context of Puritan norms, was much different than public life. In a frontier society like early New England, communities were centralized organizations with strict social norms that were upheld consistently, making privacy for sexual and economic matters basically non-existent. The essential unit of a home was the nuclear family. From marriage to death, assuming no premature occurrence of the latter, it was critical to the survival of a family group that wife, husband, and children live together. Married women in these settings typically underwent a time of about twenty years in which they reared children in addition to the obligations of daily work.

The work of a married Puritan woman was centered around domestic settings, and often was very laborious, especially in early New England. In practice, a wife and mother would be responsible for all the housework, cooking, and cleaning. But women would also trade food commodities in addition to helping each other with birth as midwives or companions. When permanent settlements were built and began to expand, “European Women, a scarce commodity, seldom stayed single long in early New England…”. Although a few decades after the initial settlements in New England, there were more women generally around as birth rates rose.

Women and law 
When personal disputes between members of Puritan communities occurred, there was a chance that the disagreement, if it proved serious enough, would be brought to court by one of the involved parties. Since women were excluded from court, but not the law, they were obligated to attend trials in the case that they also broke common law. In Northampton, Massachusetts, in 1634, the town's court records include a dispute between Maria Drew and Joan Butler. Maria's husband, Edward, having heard of the altercation from two other men in town, “preferred a complaint against Joan Butler, for calling his wife a common carted ass”.

Whatever Joan Butler may have exactly said about Maria Drew's character, she was found guilty and had to apologize and pay a small fine to Drew. But the sentence she received was different than in other disputes. Earlier in the same year, in an apparent disagreement over debt, a woman named Agnes Williams sued the widow that she had previously been “attending to in her confinement”, winning 18 hens instead of the proposed 12 that the “widow Hollens” had intended to pay. In this disagreement, there were no exchanges of personal insults, which might add to the reason why, unlike with Drew and Butler, the sentence in this case was not as harsh. The comparison of these two altercations suggests a young society that placed a great deal of emphasis on order and continuity.

Social sway 
Women were particularly adept at using societal roles to their favor. The lack of privacy in any given community made personal information valuable knowledge. Puritans valued sex for procreation as a tool to “gauge moral quality” over any other functions. Living in England during the early seventeenth century, they were very critical of pre-marital sex. “…the boundary between illicit and licit sex was crossed once a couple became committed to each other.”

Pre-marital sex with intent to marry was allowed, and even when a woman was pregnant out of wedlock it was acceptable if the same man was later married to her. Marriage was very important as it contributed to overall themes of social stability and procreation. Indeed, “given that matrimony provided the only officially authorized context for a sexual union, controversy over marital formation and dissolution had profound implications for sexual politics, in local communities as well as in county courts and legislative assemblies.” Thus, the personal was public, and privacy almost non-existent.

Native American women in 17th Century New England 
Prior to the period of colonization, Native American women lived much in the same way they had within their respective tribes for centuries. Similar to the society of colonial New England, indigenous women were ascribed specific roles in their communities. Depending on the tribe, women were usually responsible for “cooking, preserving foods, or making household utensils and furniture.” In most cases, a woman lived around other women in close groups within a community, unconfined to the central unit of a heterosexual couple, as in colonial society. They were responsible for growing and cultivating crops, most notably maize, where it was common for women to claim and use land that her mother had left her. Their work in organizing food sources accounted for up to 75 percent of the average person's annual diet.

Marriage 
The concept of marriage in Native American society differed from the colonial version in ceremony and meaning to the point where the term “marriage” would be inappropriate as a reference to long-term relationships. In contrast to the living practices of New England colonists, it would not have been uncommon to see more elastic relationships in Native society. The appearance of youthful sexual experimentation, “divorce”, and less often polygamy would have been relatively normal.

In the case of polygamy, it was often true that men with higher political standing in the tribe would be the central demographic who took multiple wives. This practice also had an added diplomatic incentive caused by the need to unite two tribes, so one tribal leader, or sachem, could marry his son to another sachem's daughter, thus furthering the union between the two tribes. In some cases, a sachem might take multiple wives who were higher-ranking members of other tribes, which reinforced the common practice of confederation building between neighboring tribes.

Major Native American Federations 
The tribes of New England referred to their people broadly as Ninnuock, which means “the people” and consisted of seven principle tribal confederations. These were the Mahican and Mohegan, Nipmuck groups, the Pequots, the Sokoki, the Abenaki, and the Pennacook. These broader groups were constantly in flux and challenging one another for local dominance. For example, of the Nipmuck confederation located in Eastern Massachusetts, were the Pocasset, one of many tribes in the area, whose lands reached down to northern Rhode Island. When the Europeans arrived, their leader, Sagamore Conbitant, was distrustful of the settler's intentions, and his early feeling later proved to be right. After he died, his daughter Weetamoo succeeded him as leader. Later she married one of Massasoits sons, bringing both their social ranks higher, and strengthening tribal bonds.

European effects on Native Women 
Indigenous people in New England during the seventeenth century were living at a time when their historic land and way of life was being steadily eroded by European settlements and customs. For women like Sarah Ahhaton who lived during the mid-seventeenth century, being a native woman in the overlapping European and Native societies was an ongoing culture clash. In spring of 1668, she lived in a small town inhabited by Christian Native Americans. When her husband William, who was the chief's son, brought charges against her with the local court, the two had already been married for ten years. Yet in the past two years, Sarah had been seen flirting with another man, known as Joseph, who was also married. Even though it was observed by the community that William had previously struck Sarah, her husband's offense became the prevailing charge, and she was ordered to no longer be left alone with Joseph. Weeks later, she and Joseph disobeyed the court ordered and fled to his mother's house a few miles away. Eventually she returned home, but as her actions will show, refused to stop seeing Joseph. Finally, after having been alleged to consummating relations with Joseph, she fled from her tribe. Sarah's story is somewhat unique but offers insight into the clear differences between each society's norms. Her answers in court, although morally superior to her husbands, were ignored as would likely have been among white settlers. The social prominence of her and her husband likely made their story a hot piece of gossip in their small community.

Women who arrived from across the Atlantic to 17th Century New England 
Most scholars agree that the first slave ship to New England, the Desire, arrived in 1638, bringing with it some of the first people of African descent to set foot in Boston. Hundreds of individuals followed the initial captives, having been captured or purchased as part of the African and international slave trades. Their story is often overlooked in the study of history, even though they were one of the three unique and diverse ethnic groups in the early colonies. Yet an understanding of the lives of women in New England who came from African or Caribbean origins and lived during the seventeenth century first requires looking to larger societal interactions that were taking place.

Modern conceptions of enslavement differ slightly from the seventeenth century, where “Puritans also used “slavery” to describe prisoners of war and criminals, and the term functioned as a rhetorical device to indicate dissatisfaction with government or authority. Still, slavery meant someone who was clearly subjugated, or “one who is the property of, and entirely subject to, another person, whether by capture, purchase, or birth; a servant completely divested of freedom and personal rights.” These two definitions, although somewhat paradoxical together, accurately describe the reality of early New England's first non-white or non-native inhabitants. To be sure, many were slaves, and some were not. Determining what life was like for women of African or West Indian descent is difficult because few if any of them left behind personal accounts. The abundance of primary sources left by Europeans offers the most comprehensive view into the lives of the region's non-white residents. Legal records are crucial to understating official stances that colonies maintained on human rights and crime, as the choices and practices of New England's courts reflect broader societal norms.

As Twombley et al. summarized, “The Puritans did not hold advanced racial views but they did place a high priority on the universality of justice.” The emphasis in Puritan society on order is exemplified by the judicial actions they enforced. Desire for prosperity was valued so highly by the early colonies that ensuring their stable continuity took priority over most other issues. The result being that a person's religious beliefs were more likely to receive negative attention than their race. Hence, of the 245 penalties recorded by the court of the Massachusetts Bay Colony between 1630 and 1641, 121 were remitted at least partially if not in full. As author Jules Zanger notes, the cause of remittances as originating from “…the significance Puritan authorities attached to confession and repentance [that] was in great part responsible for many of the remissions granted...” One takeaway here is that non-white people probably stood a better chance of fitting in if they were Christian.

See also 
 New England Puritan culture and recreation

References  

Native American history of New England
History of women in the United States
17th-century Puritans
17th-century American women